Grammoechus polygrammus is a species of beetle in the family Cerambycidae. It was described by James Thomson in 1864.

Subspecies
 Grammoechus polygrammus polygrammus J. Thomson, 1864
 Grammoechus polygrammus siporensis Breuning, 1939

References

Pteropliini
Beetles described in 1864